Globostomia is a genus of sea snails, marine gastropod mollusks in the family Pyramidellidae, the pyrams and their allies.

Species
Species within the genus Globostomia include:
 Globostomia pervicax Hoffman, van Heugten & Lavaleye, 2009

References

External links
 To World Register of Marine Species

Pyramidellidae
Monotypic gastropod genera